Spy vs Spy: The Music of Ornette Coleman is a 1989 album by American composer and saxophonist/multi-instrumentalist John Zorn, featuring the compositions of Ornette Coleman performed in the brief, intense style of Zorn's hardcore miniatures.

The liner notes thank Ornette and Denardo Coleman, Mick Harris of Napalm Death, Ted Epstein of Blind Idiot God, Pil of Lip Cream (a Japanese thrashcore group), The Accused, Craig Flanagan, DRI, CBGB, and "the New York-London-Tokyo Hardcore Triangle".  The cover artwork was created by indie comics personality Mark Beyer (of Amy and Jordan fame).  The album itself approaches free jazz from the perspective of hardcore punk, particularly taking note of the contemporary innovations of thrashcore and grindcore. Zorn would later pursue these preoccupations in the thrash jazz group Naked City.

Like some classic free jazz albums (Free Jazz, Ascension, Archie Shepp's Mama Too Tight), different saxophonists improvise simultaneously in stereo. Tim Berne appears on the left channel, while John Zorn is recorded on the right channel.

Reception
The Allmusic review by Scott Yanow awarded the album 3½ stars stating "The performances are concise with all but four songs being under three minutes and seven under two, but the interpretations are unremittingly violent. The lack of variety in either mood or routine quickly wears one out".  

The album was included in the book 1001 Albums You Must Hear Before You Die.

Track listing
All compositions by Ornette Coleman.

Personnel
John Zorn - alto saxophone
Tim Berne - alto saxophone
Mark Dresser - bass
Joey Baron - drums
Michael Vatcher - drums

References

External links
Album online on Radio3Net a radio channel of Romanian Radio Broadcasting Company

1989 albums
Albums produced by John Zorn
John Zorn albums
Elektra Records albums
Thrashcore albums